Tipperary Midwest Community Radio is a non-profit, community radio station which broadcasts from St. Michael's Street, Tipperary Town, Ireland. It broadcasts on the frequency 104.8fm and 106.7fm in the Cashel area and can be heard in parts of 8 counties in Ireland namely; Tipperary, Limerick, Cork, Waterford, Kilkenny, Carlow, Laois and Offaly.

History 
The station originally started life as a pirate station (Tipperary Community Radio - TCR), after which it gained a commercial license running under the name Tipperary Mid-West Radio (Tipp-Mid West Radio, for short). In 2003 the radio was almost shut down when a clause was introduced whereby only one commercial radio license would be granted in Co. Tipperary, Clonmel's Tipp FM gaining favourship for the licence. After a series of debates and protests including a petition signed by hundreds of listeners, the station was given a community radio (non-profit) licence by the BAI (Broadcasting Authority of Ireland).

Amalgamation with Cashel 

The station also has a secondary broadcast studio in "Halla na Féile", Cashel town. This serves to allow people in the Cashel area to present programmes without having to come to Tipperary Town as well as allowing listeners in the Cashel area to hear news and current affairs from their locality. This is done mainly through Friday's "Morning Call" programme which is broadcast from the Cashel studio. However, other music programmes are also presented from the Cashel studio also. Because the Cashel studio is a secondary station, programmes cannot be broadcast directly from Cashel and must go through a system in the main Tipperary Town studio. Therefore, when programmes are being presented from Cashel, there must always be somebody in the Tipperary Town studio to play commercial breaks, jingles and so forth as well as ensure that during these breaks, the Cashel "fader" is lowered and brought back up etc.

Programming 

The station now broadcasts 24 hours a day, 7 days a week. Live programming goes out from 8 a.m. until midnight daily. Thereafter, the "Overnight Service" is broadcast which consists of selected programming from the previous day's broadcasts. Daily programmes include music, chat, European affairs, current affairs, musician specials etc. Because of the older age bracket of many of the listeners to the station, much of the programmes have a "Country and Irish" music flavour, the preferred type of music among the listeners. Other popular programmes include Seán Buckley's "Morning Call" current affairs programme and Tom Hartnett's "Lunchtime Show" including the ever-popular daily brainteaser.

Website 

The daily programme schedule from 8 a.m. until 6 p.m., Monday to Friday is the same. The programmes after 6 p.m., at weekends and bank holidays varying somewhat. A full list of the schedule is available on [httpa://www.tippmidwestradio.com www.tippmidwestradio.com]. The website is relatively new and allows listeners to take a look at the obituaries, news and programme schedule.  The website also allows people outside the normal broadcast area and abroad to listen to Tipperary Mid-West Community Radio live on air via the online stream.

Other areas of programming include David Condon's "Classical Jukebox" (Classical music), Seamus Egan's "Cutting Edge (Rock music)" and Pat O'Connor's "Sunday Spin"(Old-time/soft jazz music) to name but a few of the other genres of programmes on the station.

The station comprises mainly on volunteer staff (well over 30 in all) with most of the evening and virtually all of the weekend programmes being presented by voluntary staff.

Station management, staff and department heads 

Chairman-Board of Management: Michael Maguire
Station Manager:              Tom Hartnett
Programme Controller:          David Condon
Advertising:                  Tom Hartnett
Receptionists: Larry Breen / Anne Crowe / Carmal McGrath
News:                         Joe Pryce
Sport:                        Michael Hennessy, Lina Ryan, Stevie O'Donnell, Jerry Ring, Mick O'Byrne (Cashel Studio)
General / Local Current Affairs Chatshow: Seán Buckley / Joe Pryce (Weekday "Morning Call" chat show)
European Affairs: Gus Scott
Farming Affairs: Jos Tobin
CCE (Irish Language/Cultural Interest): Donnocha O' Cinnéide
Local Current Affairs News: John Hassett
Red Cross/Health Interest: Tony Lawlor
Religious Affairs: Dean Philip Knowles
Arts (Classical Music, Theatre, Drama, Art): David Condon

External links 
 Tipperary Mid West Radio website
 Tipperary Mid West Radio on Facebook
 Tipperary Mid West Radio on Twitter

Community radio stations in Ireland
Radio stations in the Republic of Ireland
Mass media in County Tipperary
Radio stations established in 2004